The City Terminal Zone is the set of Long Island Rail Road lines within New York City west of Jamaica station, except the Port Washington Branch.

Routes

Current routes 
There are four routes that are part of the City Terminal Zone:
 New York Penn Station (NYP) – Trains that, from Jamaica, travel west along the Main Line to Penn Station in Manhattan via the East River Tunnels.
 Atlantic Terminal (AT) – Trains that travel along the Atlantic Branch to Brooklyn.
 Long Island City (LIC) – Trains that serve Hunterspoint Avenue and Long Island City in Queens. These trains also use the Main Line west of Jamaica, but typically skip Woodside, Forest Hills, and Kew Gardens. This route is served only during weekday rush hours in the peak direction (to Long Island City in the morning, from Long Island City in the afternoon).
 Grand Central Madison – Trains that travel along the Main Line to Grand Central Madison via East Side Access, which includes the lower level of the 63rd Street Tunnel and a new tunnel under Park Avenue. Due to clearance restrictions in the tunnel, the C3 bilevel cars cannot access the terminal.

Former routes 
The City Terminal Zone formerly included the Lower Montauk Branch from Long Island City to Jamaica until passenger service on that route was discontinued in November 2012. This line formerly included Penny Bridge, Haberman, Fresh Pond, Glendale, and Richmond Hill stations until they were closed in March 1998.

Stations 

, the Atlantic Terminal, Nostrand Avenue, and East New York stations are primarily served by a shuttle running between Atlantic Terminal and Jamaica. These stations are also served by trains on the West Hempstead Branch, as well as a limited number of weekday trains on the Hempstead and Babylon branches. Other trains traveling east of Jamaica only run to Penn Station, Grand Central Madison, or Long Island City.

Future stations 
The MTA planned a new station in Sunnyside, Queens, once East Side Access was completed. The MTA later proposed in their 2025-2044 20-year needs assessment that Sunnyside station serve both the LIRR and the Metro-North Railroad, with the latter providing service to Penn Station after Penn Station Access is completed.

See also 

 Long Island Rail Road
 List of Long Island Rail Road stations
 East Side Access

References

External links 

City Terminal Zone branch timetable

Long Island Rail Road branches
Transportation in Manhattan
Transportation in Brooklyn
Transportation in Queens, New York